Cyclamen purpurascens, the Alpine, European or purple cyclamen, is a species of flowering plant in the genus Cyclamen of the family Primulaceae, native to central Europe, northern Italy, and Slovenia. It is an evergreen tuberous perennial with (usually) variegated leaves, and deep pink flowers in summer.

Etymology
The species name purpurāscēns is a present participle from the Latin verb purpurāscō "become purple".

Distribution
It is also found in mountainous parts of Romania and western Russia, where it has been introduced.

Description

C. purpurascens blooms from summer to autumn, keeps its leaves through the winter, and produces seeds and new leaves the next summer.

Tuber
Flowers and leaves come from buds at the top of a round-flattened tuber. Roots come from the sides and bottom. Older tubers may become distorted, forming "fingers" with separate growth points. Misshapen tubers are also found in Cyclamen rohlfsianum.

Flowers
Flowers appear before or with the leaves, and have 5 upswept petals. Petals are elliptical and twisted, often curled into auricles, although less prominent than those of Cyclamen hederifolium. Forma "album" has white flowers, though it is more difficult to establish. 'Lake Garda' has silver leaves and pink flowers.

This plant has gained the Royal Horticultural Society's Award of Garden Merit.

Leaves
Leaves are kidney-shaped to heart-shaped, as wide as long or wider. The leaf edge is smooth or slightly toothed, unlike the closely related species Cyclamen colchicum, which is always prominently toothed. Leaf color varies from all-green to all-silver, but the most common pattern is green with light green to silver marbling that roughly follows the outline of the leaf. The underside is red-purple. Because of the cool and moist climate in the plant's native range, it is almost evergreen: new leaves appear in summer while the old leaves are fading. All other cyclamens, except for the closely related Cyclamen colchicum, are summer-dormant in their native range.

Fruit
After fertilization, the flower stem coils tightly, starting at the end. Seeds, amber when ripe, are held in a round pod, which ripens the summer a year after flowering and opens by 5-10 flaps.

Subdivisions

Flower forms
Cyclamen purpurascens has three naturally occurring forms, distinguished by flower color:
Cyclamen purpurascens f. purpurascens — pink to purple flowers
Cyclamen purpurascens f. carmineolineatum — white flowers with thin band of carmine
Cyclamen purpurascens f. album — all-white flowers

Leaf forms

Plain leaf
Plain leaf forms have all-green leaves. A distinct plain-leaf form is the Fatra form, also called Cyclamen fatrense (misspelled fatranse), from the Fatra Mountains in Slovakia, which has plain leaves (either matt or shiny) and larger and more abundant flowers.

Silver leaf
Plants of the Silver Leaf Group have silver on the leaves. Subtypes include the Lake Bled form (silver with a netted pattern of veins near the margin), selected from plants near Lake Bled in the Julian Alps of Slovenia, and the Limone or Lake Garda form (silver with a very thin green border and gray arrowhead pattern in the center), selected from plants near Limone sul Garda near Lake Garda in Italy.

Other leaf patterns in the Lake Garda area include dark green with silver or lighter green marbling and plain green.

Cultivars
The cultivated variety 'Green Ice', developed by Jan Bravenboer of Green Ice Nursery in the Netherlands, has a Christmas tree–shaped silver center and broad green margin. 'Green Lake' is similar, but has a light green zone in the center of the silver.

Gallery

References

Books
C. Grey-Wilson. Cyclamen: a guide for gardeners, horticulturists, and botanists. 1997.

External links

Cyclamen Society

CalPhotos
photos of regular form;Cyclamen fatrense (BOTANY.cz)
 Cyclamen fatrense (photos) — Atlas Rastlín, Nahuby.sk
flowers: Slovenia 2008 (Julian Alps) — Scottish Rock Garden Club Forum
photo of plain-leaved form (Bulb Log Diary, 30 July 2008)
Leaf Patterning in Cyclamen purpurascens in Slovenia
RHS Plant Selector
Pacific Bulb Society

purpurascens
Flora of Europe
Taxa named by Philip Miller